Talk to Your Heart is a studio album by country music artist Ray Price. It was released in 1958 by Columbia Records (catalog no. CL-1148). AllMusic gave the album four-and-a-half stars. Reviewer George Bedard called it "a great collection" and "a real-life 'Texas-flavored' record by a honky tonk master." On November 17, 1958, it was rated No. 3 on Billboard magazine's "Favorite C&W Albums" based on the magazine's annual poll of country and western disc jockeys.

Track listing
Side A
 "Talk to Your Heart" (C.M. Bradley, Louise Ulrich) - 2:26
 "I'll Keep On Loving You" (Tillman Franks) - 2:23
 "I Love You So Much It Hurts" (Tillman Franks) - 3:00
 "I Told You So" (Jimmie Davis, Rex Griffin) - 2:31
 "Wondering" (Joe Werner) - 2:11
 "Deep Water" (Fred Rose) - 2:35

Side B
 "Ice-Cold Heart" (Benny Martin) - 2:03
 "I've Gotta Have My Baby Back" (Tillman Franks) - 2:26
 "There'll Be No Teardrops Tonight" (Hank Williams) - 2:42
 "I'm Tired" (Mel Tillis, Ray Price) - 1:50
 "Driftwood on the River" (Bob Miller, John Klenner) - 2:59
 "Please Don't Leave Me" (Jesse Ashlock) - 2:05

Personnel
Ray Price - vocals
Benny Martin, Clifton Howard Vandevender, Harold Bradley, Pete Wade - guitar
Jimmy Day - steel guitar
Tommy Jackson - fiddle
Floyd "Lightnin'" Chance - bass
Floyd Cramer - piano
Buddy Harman - drums

References

1958 albums
Ray Price (musician) albums
Columbia Records albums